The Links Hotel is a 3-star hotel built in the Victorian era, located in the English seaside village of West Runton in the county of Norfolk, United Kingdom.

Location
The Links is situated within  of coastal parkland and is surrounded by National Trust protected land and areas of outstanding beauty. It is a short distance south of the centre of the village of West Runton and its railway station.

History
The village became part of the rail network of Norfolk in 1892 when a railway station was built. Seeing the potential this event gave to the village, a local land owner called James Renwick Abbs decided to build a hotel in the village. The site he chose was only 200 yards from the new station. It opened for business in 1899 and then had 34 bedrooms.

Golf course 

Abbs also contacted John Henry Taylor the professional golfer. Taylor was one of the pioneers of the modern game of golf. He was also a significant golf course architect and Abbs asked Taylor to design a new golf course for his guests to enjoy, on the land adjacent to the new hotel. The nine-hole golf course opened in 1903. In 1906 Taylor extends course to 18 holes which circles around nearby Incleborough Hill. Finally in 1912 Abbs purchased a clubhouse pavilion from Sheringham Golf Club and this was erected next to the hotel.

World War II
After the start of World War II in 1939 the hotel and golf course were commandeered by the British Army.
After the war the golf course was reinstated and Bobby Locke participated in the opening game.

References

West Runton
Hotels in West Runton
Hotels in North Norfolk
Hotels in Norfolk
Hotels established in 1899